Kuy-e Hejrat (also Romanized as Kūy-e Hejrat; also known as Kahūrtak) is a village in Cheraghabad Rural District, Tukahur District, Minab County, Hormozgan Province, Iran. At the 2006 census, its population was 356, in 73 families.

References 

Populated places in Minab County